The phrase capital of Macedonia may refer to:
 Skopje, capital of the Republic of North Macedonia
 Thessaloniki, capital of the Greek region of Macedonia
 Pella, capital of the ancient kingdom of Macedon
 Aigai, first capital of Macedon